Kay Lynn Hartzell (6 September 1948 — 26 February 2016) was a United States Coast Guard officer, notable for being the first female commanding officer of an isolated U.S. military base, when she assumed command of the Coast Guard LORAN/Omega station on the island of Lampedusa, Italy, in 1979, as a lieutenant. Hartzell retired in 1993 at the rank of commander.

She was survived by her wife Lane McClelland, her mother, and her brother.

References

1948 births
2016 deaths
United States Coast Guard officers
Female United States Coast Guard personnel
American LGBT military personnel
LGBT women
21st-century American women